The United Kingdom Strength Council was founded by Glenn Ross, the famed strongman and also founder and promoter of the Irish Strength Association. The UKSC, as it is commonly termed, was promoted by Bob Daglish's Elite Strongman Promotions until March 2010.

Beginnings
Part of the reason for the foundation was that Glenn Ross is a champion of the idea that strongman is about lifting and moving heavy objects. He has been quoted as saying that strongmen should be more akin to strongman of old, "fighting for every step, not running."

Ross's philosophy is represented in the contests the UKSC organise. There is little running with weights or like events, but rather lifting heavier weights as the main test and then struggling forward with them. Ross has said that, in relation to competing with other recognised events, such as Britain's Strongest Man, "when there is competition, it is good for everyone: competition in strongman creates an opportunity for the athletes, the fans and the sponsors to end up with a better product, and the reality is a free-market situation anyway."

"Big, strong men are like bears. As long as you keep feeding them honey, they will stay in their caves and stick with certain organizations, but when the honey pot runs out, they must go into the forest to look for more honey." - Glenn Ross

Bob Daglish's Elite strongman promotions was inextricably associated with the UKSC until it was announced in March 2010 that "In view of recent events and also some personal differences, Elite Strongman Promotions are hereby separating all affiliations with Big G promotions, the UK Strength Council and the UK strongest man competition." Elite Strongman promotions continued to run a version of the England’s strongest man final, whilst a separate competition run by UKSC was also run in 2010.

Competitions

The UKSC is famed for its blue ribbon event, UK's Strongest Man. There are also a number of regional and national qualifiers.

UK's Strongest Man

Championships by country

Repeat champions

Regional and National qualifiers
UKSC Midlands of England strongest man 2007
UKSC North of England strongest man 2007
UKSC South of England strongest man 2007
UKSC England's strongest man 2007

See also
List of Strongman Competitions

External links
Official site

References

National strongmen competitions
Strength
Strength athletics organizations